Judith Temkin Irvine (born March 10, 1945) is the Edward Sapir Collegiate Professor of Linguistic Anthropology at the University of Michigan, where she researches language use in African social life to create social hierarchy.

Irvine earned her Ph.D. in 1973 from the University of Pennsylvania. She began teaching in 1972 in the Department of Anthropology at Brandeis University and joined the faculty at the University of Michigan in 1999. Irvine received a Guggenheim Fellowship in 2005, and she was elected to the National Academy of Sciences in 2016.

References

1945 births
Living people
American anthropologists
American women anthropologists
Linguists from the United States
Women linguists
University of Pennsylvania alumni
University of Michigan faculty
Members of the United States National Academy of Sciences
American women academics
21st-century American women